WFO may refer to:
Well-founded ordering, in mathematics, see well-founded relation
W.F.O. (album), a 1994 album by the thrash metal band Overkill
Workforce optimization, strategy for managing contact center staffing, processes, and workflows.
Weather Forecast Office, a local forecasting and warning office of the United States National Weather Service: See List of National Weather Service Weather Forecast Offices
Washington Field Office, of the United States Secret Service
Washington Field Office, of the Federal Bureau of Investigation 
World Flora Online